The Watchers is an album released by Danish progressive metal band Royal Hunt, comprising a new long suite, already published in Japan in the EP titled Intervention - Part 1, re-recorded versions of old songs and some live tracks. The live tracks were recorded from May to August 2000.

Track listing
All songs written by André Andersen.
 "Intervention" – 14:02
 "Lies" (live) – 9:42
 "Flight" (live) – 4:32
 "Message to God" (live) – 6:10
 "Epilogue" (live) – 8:04
 "One by One" (re-recorded Version) – 5:33
 "Clown in the Mirror" (re-recorded Version) – 5:36
 "Day In Day Out" (re-recorded Version) – 3:59
 "Legion of the Damned" (re-recorded Version) – 5:17
 "Intervention" (Radio Edit) – 5:56

Personnel
André Andersen – keyboards and guitars
John West – lead and backing vocals
Jacob Kjaer – guitars
Steen Mogensen – bass guitar
Allan Sorensen – drums
Maria McTurk backing vocals
Kenny Lubcke backing vocals

References

External links
Heavy Harmonies page

Royal Hunt albums
2001 albums
Century Media Records albums